Metro Station was an American pop rock band that was formed in Los Angeles, California by singer Mason Musso and bassist/guitarist Trace Cyrus. In late 2006, the band signed a recording contract with Columbia Records and RED Ink Records. The band is best known for the top 10 Billboard hit single "Shake It" from the group's self-titled debut album. In 2010, tension between Cyrus and Musso caused the band to go on hiatus. In 2011, the band returned, however, it was announced that Cyrus was no longer a part of the group and Musso had purchased the rights to the name. An EP entitled Middle of the Night was released in 2013, which was led by the single "Every Time I Touch You". In 2014, Cyrus and a new drummer, Spencer Steffan, came to the band, and a new single entitled "Love & War" was released. In 2015, the band released a second full-length album, titled Savior. After this, the band went on a U.S and European tour, announcing an EP called Bury Me My Love along with a U.S. 10-year anniversary tour. Just before the tour started, the band announced it would be their final tour and that they were breaking up. They reunited once again in 2019 and released the single "I Hate Society" in 2020.

The band is often described as a scene pop band due to the members' sense of fashion and the band's unique blend of various pop styles.

History

Beginnings
In 2005, Mason Musso and Trace Cyrus agreed to meet on the set of Hannah Montana, which starred Mason's brother, Mitchel, and Trace's sister, Miley. Sharing musical interests, they decided to form a band. Shortly thereafter, Cyrus recruited Blake Healy from Synthetic Joy and the Bum Out Eternal as a keyboardist, synthesist, and bassist. Cyrus remained the singer and the lead guitarist. Musso became the group's main singer and rhythm guitarist.

Metro Station soon gained the attention of drummer Anthony Improgo, who was added as the band's drummer after the group released the song "Seventeen Forever" on its Myspace Music website. Musso sang lead on the track. The group's popularity on MySpace Music grew, and the band eventually topped the MySpace Music Unsigned Band's charts.

Metro Station was discovered by an intern working for Columbia Records' Walking Eye program, while looking through the MySpace Music charts, and the group was signed shortly thereafter.

In the July 2007 issue of music magazine Alternative Press, Metro Station was listed as one of the "22 Best Underground Bands (That Likely Won't Stay Underground for Long)."

Metro Station (2007–09)

The band released its self-titled debut album in September 2007. The album initially spawned two singles, "Kelsey" and "Control". Neither single saw a great deal of success, although "Kelsey" performed decently in the New Zealand market, peaking at number 25 and number 1 on the Billboard Dance Singles Sales chart. In April 2008, after the release of the single "Shake It", the band received a significant amount of commercial exposure, with the song peaking at number ten on the Billboard Hot 100 and also peaking within the top ten of the charts in several international markets, including Australia, Canada, Germany, New Zealand, and the United Kingdom. This led to the song going Double Platinum in the US. In the United Kingdom, "Shake It" was featured in a TV commercial for Schwarzkopf's Live Colour XXL Shake It Up Foam in late-2011. The success of the song also affected album sales, the album charting nine months later in 2008 at number 39 in the Billboard 200, number 1 in the Top Electronic Albums and number 2 in the Top Heatseekers album chart. The album went on to sell over 87,000 copies in the US and is certified gold in Canada.

In 2009 Metro Station toured in the Believers Never Die Tour Part Deux with Hey Monday, All Time Low, Cobra Starship and Fall Out Boy.

The band also contributed a song to the Alice in Wonderland soundtrack, Almost Alice, titled "Where's My Angel".

Internal disputes and hiatus (2010)
In November 2009, keyboardist Blake Healy departed from the group. A month later, drummer Anthony Improgo also left the band. In March 2010, after a number of personal disputes between band members Mason Musso and Trace Cyrus in the studio, Metro Station went into indefinite hiatus as Musso and Cyrus split to pursue solo projects, putting Metro Station on a back-burner until they felt they could record together again. Musso retained his connections to the Metro Station name, while Cyrus began a solo project he named Ashland High.

Reviving Metro Station: Middle of the Night EP (2011–13)
On May 31, 2011, Musso released a new song, "Ain't So High", on his YouTube page, metrostation2011. Musso regained rights to the Metro Station name and used the band's name without Cyrus. On July 20, Musso announced on Twitter that he was working on the new Metro Station record with help from Anthony Improgo and Blake Healy. On September 25, Musso released a new song "Closer and Closer", produced by Blake Healy. On November 20, Mason Musso, Anthony Improgo, and Ryan Daly performed at the American Music Awards Red Carpet. In May 2013, Musso released the five-track EP "Middle of the Night" through an Indiegogo campaign. Their single "Every Time I Touch You" was written by Musso and Healy.

Return of Trace Cyrus, Savior and US tour (2014–2020)
On August 13, 2014, Cyrus returned to the band, four years after previously leaving. Shortly after Cyrus' return, the band released a new single titled "Love & War" and announced the band's inclusion on The Outsiders Tour, which consisted of The Ready Set, The Downtown Fiction, and Against the Current. On October 28, 2014, the band released the music video for a single "She Likes Girls". On October 14, 2014, the group released an EP titled Gold.

The band performed on every date of the 2015 Warped Tour. On June 30, 2015, the band released a new album, Savior. The album features 18 tracks, including the single "Getting Over You" featuring Ronnie Radke. The group toured with Falling in Reverse, Atilla, and Assuming We Survive from October 2015 to December 2015. Metro Station toured with Never Shout Never, Jule Vera, and Waterparks from January 2016 to February 2016.

Metro Station has announced that the band is in the process of recording an acoustic album.

On September 2, 2016, the band announced that they were set to tour again in October and November alongside Palaye Royale. In 2017, the band announced they were breaking up. They eventually reunited in 2019 and released the single "I Hate Society" in 2020.

Band members
 

Final line-up
 Mason Musso – vocals, guitars, keyboards, synthesizer (2006–2017, 2019-2020)
 Trace Cyrus – vocals, guitars, bass, synthesizer (2006–2010, 2014–2017, 2019-2020)
 Spencer Steffan - drums, backing vocals (2015–2017, 2019-2020; touring 2014–2015)
Past members
 Blake Healy – keyboards, synthesizer, bass (2006–2009, 2013)
 Anthony Improgo – drums (2006–2009, 2013–2014)
 Kenny Bozich – keyboards, synthesizer, guitars, bass, drums (2009–2010)
 Austin Sands – keyboards, guitars (2011–2013)
 Cary White – drums (2011–2013)

Former touring members
 Jimmy Gregerson – guitars, keyboards, synthesizer (2015–2017)
 Ryan Daly – guitars, backing vocals (2012–2013)
 Bryan Lemus – keyboards, synthesizer (2014–2015)
 Jeff Simpson – keyboards, synthesizer (2015)

Timeline

Discography

 Metro Station (2007)
 Savior (2015)

Awards and nominations

References

External links

 
 
 Interview with the band
 Backstage with Metro Station – Blender.com: November, 2008
 
 Metro Station Interview in Australia

Musical groups established in 2006
Musical groups from Los Angeles
Musical quartets
American pop rock music groups
American synth-pop groups
Columbia Records artists
Musical groups disestablished in 2010
Musical groups reestablished in 2011
Musical groups disestablished in 2017
Musical groups reestablished in 2019